Copelatus regimbarti is a species of diving beetle. It is part of the genus Copelatus in the subfamily Copelatinae of the family Dytiscidae. It was described by Branden in 1885.

References

regimbarti
Beetles described in 1885